This is a list of newspapers published by Digital First Media, the successor to 21st Century Media.

The company owns daily and weekly newspapers, and other print media properties and newspaper-affiliated local Websites in the U.S. states of Connecticut, Michigan, New York, Ohio, Pennsylvania, and New Jersey, organized in six geographic "clusters":

Capital-Saratoga 
Three dailies, associated weeklies and pennysavers in greater Albany, New York
 The Oneida Daily Dispatch''''  of Oneida, New York
 The Record  of Troy, New York
 The Saratogian  of Saratoga Springs, New York
 Weeklies:
 Community News  weekly of Clifton Park, New York
 Rome Observer  of Rome, New York
 WG Life   of Wilton, New York
 Ballston Spa Life   of Ballston Spa, New York
 Greenbush Life  of Troy, New York
 Latham Life  of Latham, New York
 River Life  of Troy, New York

 Connecticut 
Three dailies, associated weeklies, and pennysavers in the state of Connecticut
 The Middletown Press  of Middletown
 New Haven Register  of New Haven
 The Register Citizen  of Torrington
 Housatonic Publications 
 The Housatonic Times  of New Milford
 Litchfield County Times  of Litchfield
 Minuteman Publications
 Fairfield Minuteman of Fairfield
 The Westport Minuteman  of Westport
 Shoreline Newspapers 
 The Dolphin  of Naval Submarine Base New London in New London
 Shoreline Times  of Guilford
 Foothills Media Group 
 Thomaston Express  of Thomaston
 Good News About Torrington  of Torrington
 Granby News  of Granby
 Canton News  of Canton
 Avon News  of Avon
 Simsbury News  of Simsbury
 Litchfield News  of Litchfield
 Foothills Trader  of Torrington, Bristol, Canton
 Other weeklies
 The Milford-Orange Bulletin  of Orange
 The Post-Chronicle  of North Haven
 West Hartford News  of West Hartford
 Magazines
 The Connecticut Bride 
 Connecticut Magazine 
 Passport Magazine Michigan 
Four dailies, associated weeklies, and pennysavers in the state of Michigan
 Oakland Press  of Oakland
 Daily Tribune  of Royal Oak
 The Macomb Daily  of Mt. Clemens
 Morning Sun  of  Mount Pleasant
 Heritage Newspapers 
 Belleville View 
 Ile Camera 
 Monroe Guardian  
 Ypsilanti Courier 
 News-Herald 
 Press & Guide 
 Chelsea Standard & Dexter Leader 
 Manchester Enterprise 
 Milan News-Leader 
 Saline Reporter 
 Independent Newspapers 
 Advisor 
 Source 
 Morning Star 
 The Leader & Kalkaskian 
 Grand Traverse Insider 
 Alma Reminder Alpena Star Ogemaw/Oscoda County Star Presque Isle Star St. Johns Reminder Voice Newspapers 
 Armada Times Bay Voice Blue Water Voice Downriver Voice Macomb Township Voice North Macomb Voice Weekend Voice Mid-Hudson 
One daily, associated magazines in the Hudson River Valley of New York
 Daily Freeman  of Kingston, New York
 Las Noticias  of Kingston, New York

 Ohio 
Two dailies and associated magazines
 The News-Herald  of Willoughby
 The Morning Journal  of Lorain
 El Latino Expreso  of Lorain

 Philadelphia area 
Seven dailies and associated weeklies and magazines in Pennsylvania and New Jersey
 The Daily Local News  of West Chester
 Delaware County Daily and Sunday Times  of Primos Upper Darby Township, Pennsylvania
 The Mercury  of Pottstown
 The Reporter  of Lansdale
 The Times Herald  of Norristown
 The Trentonian  of Trenton, New Jersey
 Weeklies
 The Phoenix  of Phoenixville, Pennsylvania
 El Latino Expreso  of Trenton, New Jersey
 La Voz  of Norristown, Pennsylvania
 The Tri County Record  of Morgantown, Pennsylvania
 Penny Pincher of Pottstown, Pennsylvania
 Chesapeake Publishing  
 The Kennett Paper  of Kennett Square, Pennsylvania
 Avon Grove Sun  of West Grove, Pennsylvania
 The Central Record  of Medford, New Jersey
 Maple Shade Progress  of Maple Shade, New Jersey
 Intercounty Newspapers   
 The Pennington Post  of Pennington, New Jersey
 The Bristol Pilot  of Bristol, Pennsylvania
 Yardley News  of Yardley, Pennsylvania
 Advance of Bucks County  of Newtown, Pennsylvania
 Record Breeze  of Berlin, New Jersey
 Community News  of Pemberton, New Jersey
 Montgomery Newspapers  
 Ambler Gazette  of Ambler, Pennsylvania
 The Colonial  of Plymouth Meeting, Pennsylvania
 Glenside News  of Glenside, Pennsylvania
 The Globe  of Lower Moreland Township, Pennsylvania
 Montgomery Life  of Fort Washington, Pennsylvania
 North Penn Life  of Lansdale, Pennsylvania
 Perkasie News Herald  of Perkasie, Pennsylvania
 Public Spirit  of Hatboro, Pennsylvania
 Souderton Independent  of Souderton, Pennsylvania
 Springfield Sun  of Springfield, Pennsylvania
 Spring-Ford Reporter  of Royersford, Pennsylvania
 Times Chronicle  of Jenkintown, Pennsylvania
 Valley Item  of Perkiomenville, Pennsylvania
 Willow Grove Guide  of Willow Grove, Pennsylvania
 The Review  of Roxborough, Philadelphia, Pennsylvania
 Main Line Media News 
 Main Line Times  of Ardmore, Pennsylvania
 Main Line Life  of Ardmore, Pennsylvania
 The King of Prussia Courier  of King of Prussia, Pennsylvania
 Delaware County News Network  
 News of Delaware County  of Havertown, Pennsylvania
 County Press  of Newtown Square, Pennsylvania
 Garnet Valley Press  of Glen Mills, Pennsylvania
 Springfield Press  of Springfield, Pennsylvania
 Town Talk  of Ridley, Pennsylvania
 Berks-Mont Newspapers  
 The Boyertown Area Times  of Boyertown, Pennsylvania
 The Kutztown Area Patriot  of Kutztown, Pennsylvania
 The Hamburg Area Item  of Hamburg, Pennsylvania
 The Southern Berks News  of Exeter Township, Berks County, Pennsylvania
 Community Connection  of Boyertown, Pennsylvania
 Magazines
 Bucks Co. Town & Country Living  
 Parents Express  
 Real Men, Rednecks

References